Esad Čolaković (27 April 1970 – 26 May 2016) was a Macedonian football defender of Bosniak descent, who last played for FK Sloga Jugomagnat.

International career 
He made his senior debut for Macedonia in an April 1998 friendly match against South Korea, which proved to be his sole international game.

Death
Čolaković died in Skopje on 26 May 2016.

Honours
Macedonian First League: 2
 1998–99, 1999–2000

References

External sources

1970 births
2016 deaths
Macedonian people of Bosnia and Herzegovina descent
Association football defenders
Macedonian footballers
North Macedonia international footballers
FK Sloga Jugomagnat players
FK Vardar players
FK Cementarnica 55 players
FK Kumanovo players
Macedonian First Football League players